Schwedt (Oder) station is, along with the halt of Schwedt (Oder) Mitte, a station in the town of Schwedt in the Uckermark district of the German state of Brandenburg. It is heritage listed along with the goods sheds, the locomotive shed, the water tower and the water crane.

Location
The station is located at the kilometre 23.1 km of the Angermünde-Schwedt railway, about one kilometre east of the town centre. Adjacent roads are Gustav-Rotkopf-Straße, Karl-Marx-Straße and Berliner Straße. The nearest station to the west is Schwedt (Oder) Mitte, about one kilometre away. The station is in the area of the Verkehrsverbund Berlin-Brandenburg (Berlin-Brandenburg transport association).

History
At the same time, the station was put into operation along with the Angermünde–Schwedt railway on 15 December 1873.
 
In 1981, seven trains a day ran from Angermünde to Schwedt station about 5:31, 9:00, 14:13, 16:06, 16:58, 18:17 and 20:57. Services ran from Schwedt to Angermünde at about 6:10, 6:48, 9:15, 10:48, 16:34, 16:53, 18:13, 19:01 and 21:20.

Facilities
Today, the station has one side platform, which is 189 m long and 76 cm heigh. It once had various freight transport facilities.

Verkehrsanbindung 
In the 2016 timetable Schwedt (Oder) station is served by the following services:

References

External links

 
 
 

Railway stations in Brandenburg
Buildings and structures in Uckermark (district)
Railway stations in Germany opened in 1873